Louis Kleberg (May 1, 1802– July 1, 1847) was a German Texan soldier in the Texas Revolution and a member of the frontier forces.

Biography
Kleberg was born in Herstelle, Westphalia.  In 1834, with the Roeder party, he immigrated to Texas.  Kleberg was the older brother of Robert J. Kleberg.  He fought at the Siege of Bexar in Captain Thomas F. L. Parrott's company.  In 1839 he served in Captain John Bird's company, defending against the Native Americans.  Kleberg is buried in a small cemetery on private property.

Sources
John Henry Brown, Indian Wars and Pioneers of Texas, 1880

External links
 Handbook of Texas Online Article on Louis Kleberg 
 Texas A&M University on Kleberg Family
 THE FIRST GERMAN SETTLEMENT IN TEXAS
 http://www.tshaonline.org/handbook/online/articles/fkl15

1802 births
1847 deaths
German emigrants to the United States
People from the Province of Westphalia
People of the Texas Revolution
Kleberg family